Montecristo is an upcoming Mexican streaming television miniseries based on Alexandre Dumas' 1844 novel The Count of Monte Cristo. The series will star William Levy in the title role.

It will premiere on Vix+ in 2023.

Cast 
 William Levy as Edmundo Dantés / Alejandro Montecristo
 Esmeralda Pimentel
 Roberto Enríquez as Fernando Alvarez Mondego
 Silvia Abascal
 Juan Fernández as Cristobal Herrera
 Guiomar Puerta
 Héctor Noas
 Franky Martín
 Itziar Atienza
 Javier Godino
 Alberto Olmo
 Ana Álvarez
 Roberto San Martín
 Andrew Tarbet

Production

Development 
On 13 January 2022, it was announced that Pantaya, Secuoya Studios and William Levy Entertainment would co-produce an adaption of Alexandre Dumas' 1844 novel The Count of Monte Cristo. Filming began in June 2022 in Madrid and the Canary Islands. On 24 January 2023, it was announced that the series would premiere on Vix, following TelevisaUnivision's acquisition of Pantaya.

Casting 
In January 2022, it was announced that Levy would star in the lead role. In April 2022, it was announced that Esmeralda Pimentel would star in the series.

References 

Upcoming television series
Vix (streaming service) original programming
Television shows based on The Count of Monte Cristo